Marek Konwa (born 11 March 1990 in Zielona Góra) is a Polish cyclo cross and cross-country mountain biker. At the 2012 Summer Olympics, he competed in the Men's cross-country at Hadleigh Farm, finishing in 16th place. He was on the start list for the 2018 Cross-country European Championship and he finished in 21st place.

Major results

Cyclo-cross

2006–07
 1st  National Junior Cyclo-cross Championships
 9th UCI World Junior Cyclo-cross Championships
2007–08
 1st Grand Prix Lille Métropole Juniors
 1st Koppenbergcross Juniors
 1st Gieten, Superprestige Juniors
 3rd National Junior Cyclo-cross Championships
2008–09
 1st Veghel, Superprestige Under-23
 2nd National Under-23 Cyclo-cross Championships
 9th UCI World Under-23 Cyclo-cross Championships
2009–10
 3rd  UCI World Under-23 Cyclo-cross Championships
2010–11
 1st  National Under-23 Cyclo-cross Championships
2011–12
 1st  National Under-23 Cyclo-cross Championships
 1st Bryksy Cross
 6th UCI World Under-23 Cyclo-cross Championships
2012–13
 1st  National Cyclo-cross Championships
 1st Bryksy Cross
2013–14
 1st  National Cyclo-cross Championships
2014–15
 1st  National Cyclo-cross Championships
2015–16
 1st  National Cyclo-cross Championships
2016–17
 1st  National Cyclo-cross Championships
 3rd Overall Toi Toi Cup
2nd Kolín
3rd Holé Vrchy
3rd Jabkenice
2017–18
 1st  National Cyclo-cross Championships
 1st GP Poprad
 3rd Overall Toi Toi Cup
1st Milovice
2nd Holé Vrchy
3rd Jabkenice
2018–19
 1st  National Cyclo-cross Championships
2019-20
 1st  National Cyclo-cross Championships
2020–21
 1st  National Cyclo-cross Championships
 Toi Toi Cup
1st Kolín
 1st Bryksy Cross Gościęcin
2021–22
 1st  National Cyclo-cross Championships
 Toi Toi Cup
1st Hlinsko
2nd Veselí nad Lužnicí
 1st Munich Super Cross
 1st Int. Sparkassen Querfeldein GP Pferdezentrum Austria
 1st Bryksy Cross Gościęcin
2022–23
 1st  National Cyclo-cross Championships

Mountain bike

2009
 2nd National Cross-country Championships
 5th Under-23 Cross-country, UCI Mountain Bike World Championships
2010
 2nd National Cross-country Championships
 6th Under-23 Cross-country, UCI Mountain Bike World Championships
2011
 2nd National Cross-country Championships
 2nd  Under-23 Cross-country, UCI Mountain Bike World Championships
 5th Overall UCI Under-23 Cross-country World Cup
2012
 1st  National Cross-country Championships
2013
 1st  National Cross-country Championships
2014
 World University Mountain Bike Championships
1st  Time trial
2nd  Cross-country
 1st  National Cross-country Championships
2015
 1st  National Cross-country Championships
2017
 1st  National Cross-country Championships
2018
 2nd National Cross-country Championships

Road
2014
 10th Overall Tour of Małopolska

References

External links

People from Zielona Góra
Polish male cyclists
Cross-country mountain bikers
Living people
Olympic cyclists of Poland
Cyclists at the 2012 Summer Olympics
1990 births
Sportspeople from Lubusz Voivodeship
Cyclo-cross cyclists
Cyclists at the 2015 European Games
European Games competitors for Poland
21st-century Polish people